Marengo is a rural locality in Victoria, Australia, situated in the Shire of Colac Otway.

References

External links

Towns in Victoria (Australia)
Shire of Colac Otway